Raphitoma smriglioi is a species of sea snail, a marine gastropod mollusk in the family Raphitomidae.

Description
The length of the shell attains 9.4 mm.

Distribution
This marine species occurs in the Mediterranean Sea off Sicily, Italy

References

 Pusateri F., Giannuzzi-Savelli R. & Oliverio M. 2013. A revision of the Mediterranean Raphitomidae 2: On the sibling species Raphitoma lineolata (B.D.D., 1883) and Raphitoma smriglioi n. sp. Iberus, 31(1): 11-20

External links
 Biolib.cz: Raphitoma smriglioi

smriglioi
Gastropods described in 2013